Andreas Stoichevich (1751-1810) was an Austrian nobleman and general who fought in the Napoleonic Wars particularly in the Dalmatian Campaign where Napoleon's favorite general Marmont was caught off-guard. Stoichevich also led his regiment in four or five more battles, namely Sacile, Caldiero, Tarvis and Graz before he died early following year in Agram on 6 January 1810.

Biography
Andreas Stoichevich was born in 1751 in Banat to a military family of a long-line of Grenz infantrymen of the Military Frontier that can trace back their roots to the earliest warriors who valiantly defended Serbian lands in the 14th century only to be invaded in 1454 with the fall of Smederevo. Stoichevich received his training as a cadet at a Military Academy before his first appointment as an officer in the Imperial-Royal Army. He fought in several battles in his youth including the Siege of Belgrade, led by Ernst von Laudon where Stoichevich distinguished himself. On 18 February 1804 he was promoted to brigadier general and on 1 September 1805 became a major general. 

In the Napoleonic Wars, Stoichevich fought under the divisional commander Baron Vinko Knežević when the corps structure underwent a change with Stoichevich being ordered by Archduke John to detach to fight against Auguste de Marmont in the Dalmatian Campaign. That was right after the Battle of Sacile and the Battle of Caldiero that he mustered his regiment without respite and went into battle again. It was in the Battle of Travis that he played a crucial role in ousting Napoleon's French Army along and the General of the Division Marmont, though it cost him a victory.

References 

1751 births
1810 deaths